The huge moth family Noctuidae contains the following genera:

A B C D E F G H I J K L M N O P Q R S T U V W X Y Z

Ebertidia
Ecbolemia
Eccleta
Eccrita
Echana
Echanella
Echinocampa
Eclipsea
Ecnomia
Ecpatia
Ecthetis
Ecthymia
Ectoblemma
Ectochela
Ectogonia
Ectogoniella
Ectolopha
Ectopatria
Ectrogatha
Edessena
Edlaeveria
Edmondsia
Edyma
Effractilis
Eggyna
Egira
Egnasia
Egnasides
Egone
Egryrlon
Egybolis
Eicomorpha
Elaemima
Elaeodopsis
Elaphria
Elaphristis
Elecussa
Eleemosia
Elegarda
Elegocampa
Elesotis
Elixoia
Elocussa
Elousa
Elpia
Elusa
Elwesia
Elydna
Elygea
Elyptron
Elyra
Emarginea
Emariannia
Emboloecia
Emmelia
Empelathra
Empusada
Enargia
Encruphion
Enea
Enedena
Engelhardtia
Engusanacantha
Enigmogramma
Enispa
Enispades
Enispodes
Enmonodia
Enmonodiops
Ensipia
Enterpia
Entomogramma
Enydra
Eogena
Eopaectes
Eordaea
Eosphoropteryx
Epa
Epharmottomena
Ephesia
Ephyrodes
Epicarsia
Epicausis
Epicerynea
Epiconcana
Epicyrtica
Epidelta
Epidemas
Epidromia
Epiglaea
Epigrypera
Epigrypodes
Epilecta
Epilitha
Epimecia
Epimeciodes
Epinyctis
Epioecia
Epipsammia
Epipsilia
Epipsiliamorpha
Epischausia
Episcotia
Episema
Episparina
Episparis
Episparonia
Episteme
Epistrema
Epitausa
Epithisanotia
Epitomiptera
Epitripta
Epizeuxis
Epopsima
Eporectis
Equatosypna
Erastrifacies
Erastriopis
Erastroides
Ercheia
Erebophasma
Erebostrota
Erebothrix
Erebus
Eremaula
Eremnophanes
Eremobastis
Eremobia
Eremobina
Eremochlaena
Eremochroa
Eremodrina
Eremohadena
Eremonoma
Eremophysa
Eremopola
Ericathia
Ericeia
Eriocera
Eriopyga
Eriopygodes
Erioscele
Erna
Erocha
Eromene
Eromidia
Erygansa
Erygia
Erymella
Erysthia
Erythroecia
Erythrophaia
Erythroplusia
Erythrotis
Escandia
Escaria
Escua
Essonistis
Estagrotis
Esteparia
Esthlodora
Estimata
Ethionodes
Ethiopica
Ethioterpia
Euaethiops
Euagrotis
Euamiana
Euaontia
Eublarginea
Eublemma
Eublemmara
Eublemmistis
Eublemmoides
Eubolina
Eubryopterella
Eucala
Eucalimia
Eucalyptra
Eucampima
Eucapnodes
Eucarta
Eucatephia
Euchalcia
Euchoristea
Euchromalia
Eucirroedia
Eucladodes
Euclidia
Euclidiana
Euclidina
Euclystis
Eucocytia
Eucoptocnemis
Eucora
Eucosmocara
Eucropia
Eucyclomma
Eudaphaenura
Euderaea
Eudesmeola
Eudipna
Eudocima
Eudragana
Eudrapa
Eudryas
Eudyops
Euedwardsia
Eueretagrotis
Eugatha
Eugnathia
Eugnorisma
Eugoniella
Eugorna
Eugrammodes
Eugraphe
Eugrapta
Eugraptoblemma
Euharveya
Euherrichia
Euheterospila
Euhypena
Euimata
Euippodes
Eulaphygma
Eulepa
Eulepidotis
Euleucyptera
Eulintneria
Eulithosia
Eulocastra
Eulonche
Eulymnia
Eumestleta
Eumichtis
Eumichtochroa
Eumicremma
Euminucia
Eumuelleria
Euneophlebia
Eunetis
Eunimbatana
Euonychodes
Eupalindia
Eupanychis
Euparthenos
Eupatula
Euphiusa
Euplexia
Euplexidia
Euplocia
Eupsephopaectes
Eupseudomorpha
Eupsilia
Eupsoropsis
Eurabila
Eurogramma
Eurois
Euromoia
Euros
Eurypsyche
Euryschema
Eurythmus
Eusceptis
Euschesis
Euscirrhopterus
Euscotia
Eusimara
Eusimplex
Eustrotia
Eustrotiopis
Eutactis
Eutamsia
Eutelephia
Eutelia
Euteliella
Eutermina
Euterpiodes
Euthales
Eutheiaplusia
Euthermesia
Eutolype
Eutoreuma
Eutornoptera
Eutrichopidia
Eutricopis
Eutrinita
Eutrogia
Euviminia
Euwilemania
Euxenistis
Euxoa
Euxoamorpha
Euxootera
Euxoullia
Euzancla
Evanina
Evia
Eviridemas
Evisa
Exagrotis
Exarnis
Exathetis
Exophyla
Exsula
Extremoplusia
Extremypena
Exyra

References 

 Natural History Museum Lepidoptera genus database

 
Noctuid genera E